AmFam may refer to:

American Family Insurance, an American Insurance Company founded in 1927
American Family Fitness, a Richmond, Virginia-based health club founded in 1988